Kafkas University is a public higher educational institution established on July 11, 1992, in Kars, Eastern Anatolia in Turkey. It has six faculties, three institutes, three colleges, four vocational colleges and several research and application centers.

Academic units
Faculties
 Veterinary
 Science and Letters
 Economics, Business Administration, Political science and public administration
 Education
 Medicine
 Dentistry
 Engineering and Architecture

Institutes
 Sciences
 Health Sciences
 Social Sciences

Colleges
 Sarıkamış Physical Education and Sports
 Kars Health Sciences
 Foreign Languages

Vocational colleges (VC)
 Kars VC
 Kağızman VC
 Sarıkamış VC
 Atatürk Health Services VC
 Social Sciences VC

Research and application centers
 Atatürk's Thoughts and Reforms, History Research and Application Center
 Livestock Research and Application Center
 Caucasus and Central Asia Research Center
 Strategic Research Center
 Continuous Education Research and Application Center
 Health Research and Application Center
 Disabled Problems Research and Application Center
 Women Problems Research and Application Center
 Turkish Anthropology Research and Application Center

Collaboration and MoU with foreign universities and institutes

Islamic University, Bangladesh (MoU)

Affiliations
The university is a member of the Caucasus University Association.

References

Universities and colleges in Turkey
Education in Kars
State universities and colleges in Turkey
Educational institutions established in 1992
1992 establishments in Turkey